Reeking Pained and Shuddering is the second full-length studio album by Gnaw Their Tongues, released on September 8, 2007 by Paradigms Recordings.

Track listing

Personnel
Adapted from the Reeking Pained and Shuddering liner notes.
 Maurice de Jong (as Mories) – vocals, instruments, recording, cover art

Release history

References

External links 
 
 Reeking Pained and Shuddering at Bandcamp

2007 albums
Gnaw Their Tongues albums